Gul Rahman (died November 20, 2002) was an Afghan man, suspected by the United States of being a militant, who was a victim of torture. He died in a secret CIA prison, or black site, located in northern Kabul, Afghanistan known as the Salt Pit. He had been captured October 29, 2002.

His name was kept secret by the United States for more than seven years, although his death was announced. In 2010 the Associated Press reported that before his death he was left half-stripped and chained against a concrete wall on a night when the temperature was close to freezing. The United States government did not notify his family (wife and four daughters) of his death, according to the report.

Capture and death
Gul Rahman was captured and arrested on October 29, 2002, during a joint operation by U.S. agents and Pakistani security forces against Hezb-e-Islami Gulbuddin. He was reportedly arrested with the physician Ghairat Baheer, the son-in-law of the warlord Gulbuddin Hekmatyar, who led the insurgent faction Hezb-e-Islami. Rahman had traveled from Peshawar to Islamabad, Pakistan for a medical checkup when he was arrested at the home of Ghairat Baheer, and subsequently flown by the CIA to Afghanistan.

U.S. officials claim Rahman was "violently uncooperative" while in custody at the Salt Pit, the CIA code name for an abandoned brick factory that had been turned into a CIA black site or covert interrogation center, including threatening to kill his guards – who responded by beating him. Rahman was also subjected to "48 hours of sleep deprivation, auditory overload, total darkness, isolation, a cold shower and rough treatment".

This technique of shackling is known as "short-chaining." The detainee is shackled "in a short chain position, which prevents prisoners from standing upright." A CIA pathologist reported that Rahman likely froze to death.

His death prompted an internal CIA review and the development of improved guidance. No one was ever charged in his death.

Rescue of Hamid Karzai

According to Gul's brother, Habib Rahman, Gul Rahman was involved in a 1994 rescue of Hamid Karzai, the president of Afghanistan from 2001 to 2014. Karzai had been imprisoned by the government forces, and Rahman was working for Hekmatyar, whose forces fired rockets at the building while Rahman entered and freed Karzai. Rahman took him to a safe house in Kabul.

Senate Intelligence Committee's report of CIA torture
On December 9, 2014, the Senate Intelligence Committee report on CIA torture was published. According to that report he had been subjected to total darkness, sensory overload, sleep deprivation, cold shower, rough treatment, short shackling, and finally froze to death. The report said he was the only captive known to have died in CIA custody.

On October 13, 2015, the American Civil Liberties Union filed a lawsuit  on behalf of Rahman's estate and two other former detainees against two psychologists, James Mitchell and Bruce Jessen, who they maintain were responsible for designing the protocols that resulted in Rahman's death and the torture of the other two plaintifs. The ACLU case is the first lawsuit brought against significant individuals identified in the Senate report since it was published. On July 28, 2017, U.S. District Judge Justin Lowe Quackenbush denied both parties motions for summary judgment, noted that the defendants are indemnified by the United States government, and encouraged the attorneys to reach a settlement before trial.

See also
Mohammed Ahmad Ghulam Rabbani
Lufti Al-Arabi Al-Gharisi
Abd al-Rahim al-Nashiri

References

External links
"Salt Pit Death: Gul Rahman, CIA Prisoner, Died Of Hypothermia In Secret Afghanistan Prison", Huffington Post
"Author of Torture Memos Admits Some Techniques Were Not Approved By DOJ" , Truth-Out

20th-century births
2002 deaths
Afghan expatriates in Pakistan
Afghan people who died in prison custody
Afghan torture victims
Deaths from hypothermia
Pashtun people
Place of birth missing
Prisoners and detainees held in the Salt Pit
Prisoners who died in United States military detention
Victims of human rights abuses